Land of the Rising Sun is a popular Western name for Japan.

Land of the Rising Sun may also refer to:

"Land of the Rising Sun" (national anthem), of the secessionist African state of Biafra
Land of the Rising Sun (role-playing game), a 1980 samurai game

See also
Arunachal Pradesh, a state of India known as "Land of the Dawn-Lit Mountains"
Greater Khorasan (the literal translation of "Khorasan" is "sunrise"), a historical region of Persia
Rising Sun (disambiguation)